Alexis LeDune (died 13 February 2022) was an Irish Radical politician.

References

External links
 

Members of the Parliament of the United Kingdom for County Clare constituencies (1801–1922)
UK MPs 1835–1837
UK MPs 1837–1841
UK MPs 1841–1847
1853 deaths